HMS Meteor was a  destroyer that served in the British  Royal Navy. Meteor saw extensive service throughout World War I, maintaining continuous operations both as a convoy escort and in harbour protection.

Construction
Meteor was one of a pair of destroyers ordered from Thornycroft & Company as part of the 1913–14 construction programme for the Royal Navy. In order to speed construction, initial payments were made prior to the formal order being placed. Meteor was laid down at Thornycroft's Southampton shipyard on 17 May 1913, launched on 24 July 1914 and completed in September 1914 at a contract price of £127,060.

The ship's crew consisted of 82 officers and men. Armament consisted of three QF  Mk IV guns mounted on the ships centreline, and four 21 inch (533 mm) torpedo tubes in two twin mounts. In 1917, Meteor was converted to a minelayer, being capable of carrying 40 mines.

Service history
Meteor served with the Harwich Force 1914–1917. Ophelia was seized by the British as a spy ship and renamed SS Huntly.

On 23 January 1915, the German battlecruisers under Admiral Franz von Hipper made a sortie to attack British fishing boats on the Dogger Bank. British Naval Intelligence was warned of the raid by radio messages decoded by Room 40, and sent out the Battlecruiser Force from Rosyth, commanded by Admiral Beatty aboard  and the Harwich Force, commanded by Commodore Reginald Tyrwhitt aboard the light cruiser  were sent out to intercept the German force. Meteor was one of seven M-class destroyers sailing with the Harwich Force. The British and German Forces met on the morning of 24 January in the Battle of Dogger Bank. On sighting the British, Hipper ordered his ships to head south-east to escape the British, who set off in pursuit. Being the fastest destroyers available to the British, the seven M-class were sent ahead to report the strength of the German forces. Although briefly forced to turn away by fire from the armoured cruiser , they managed to successfully report the German's strength and course before being ordered to pull back and take up station ahead of the British line as Beatty's battlecruisers came into gun range of the German ships.  At about 09:20, German destroyers appeared to be preparing a torpedo attack, and the British destroyers were ordered ahead of the line in order to prevent such an attack. Only the M-class destroyers had sufficient speed to respond and slowly draw ahead of the British battlecruisers, but no attack by German destroyers followed. Later, at about 11:00, an emergency turn to avoid a non-existent German submarine and misinterpretation of signals from Lion caused the British battlecruisers to concentrate on Blücher, already badly damaged and trailing well behind the other German ships, and allowing the rest of Hipper's fleet to escape. Meteor led three other destroyers in a torpedo attack against Blücher but was hit by a shell in the forward boiler room which knocked her out of action, killing four and wounding two. Blücher was eventually overwhelmed by British shells and torpedoes, sinking at 12:10, while Meteor was towed back to the Humber by the destroyer .

By June 1915, Meteor had joined the 10th Destroyer Flotilla, and was part of the escort for three minelayers, that laid a field of 1450 mines in the North Sea on 10 September 1915. Meteor was part of the escort for the seaplane carrier  when Vindex launched an unsuccessful air attack against a German Zeppelin base believed to be at Hoyer in Schleswig-Holstein  on 25–25 March 1916. Only two out of five seaplanes dispatched returned, reporting that the Zeppelin base was in fact at Tondern, but that they were unable to attack the base.

On the night of 23/24 January 1917, the Harwich Force was ordered to intercept a German destroyer flotilla that was being transferred to Zeebrugge, with Meteor part of a group of destroyers patrolling off the River Maas. The German destroyers ran into a cruiser division, with the destroyer  heavily damaged, but the Germans managed to escape, and the British destroyers, including Meteor dispersed from their patrol positions after hearing the noise of the engagement, allowing the German ships to slip through. One German straggler,  encountered a British destroyer patrol and sank the destroyer  before escaping.

Meteor joined the Sixth Destroyer Flotilla, part of the Dover Patrol in February 1917. Meteor was mined on 13 March 1917, but had returned to operations with the Sixth Destroyer Flotilla by July 1917. On the night of 13/14 July 1917, Meteor took part along with three other destroyers (including  and ) in laying a minefield off Ostend, during which operation Tarpon struck a mine and was badly damaged. Meteor, along with other minelaying destroyers based at Dover, carried out a series of minelaying operations off Cap Gris Nez in the winter of 1917–1918. Meteor continued to carry out minelaying operations for the rest of the war, laying magnetic mines off Ostend during August 1918. In total, Meteor laid 1082 mines during the First World War.

The destroyer was sold for scrapping in May 1921.

References

Notes

Citations

Sources
 
 
 
 
  
 
 
 
 
 
 
 

 

Thornycroft M-class destroyers
Ships built in Southampton
1914 ships
World War I destroyers of the United Kingdom